Dama Kumari Sharma is a Nepalese politician, belonging to the Communist Party of Nepal (Maoist). In the 2008 Constituent Assembly election she was elected from the Dang-2 constituency, winning 20240 votes.

References

Living people
Communist Party of Nepal (Maoist Centre) politicians
Nepalese atheists
Year of birth missing (living people)

Members of the 1st Nepalese Constituent Assembly